The 1896 Minor Counties Championship was the second running of the Minor Counties Cricket Championship, and ran from 25 May to 29 August 1896. Worcestershire won their first outright title, having shared the previous year's championship. Buckinghamshire were runners-up and were the only other team to win more games than they lost. Thirteen teams competed in the championship, down one from the previous year. Bedfordshire, Cheshire and Lincolnshire were absent, while Glamorgan and Northumberland made their Minor Counties Championship debuts.

The leading run-scorer, Harry Foster, who played for Worcestershire, was the only batsman to score more than one century over the course of the season. The leading wicket-taker, Buckinghamshire's George Nash, took the two largest match wicket hauls of the season: 14/100 and 12/102 against Northamptonshire and Oxfordshire, respectively.

Table
 One point was awarded for a win, and one point was taken away for each loss. Final placings were decided by dividing the number of points earned by the number of completed matches (i.e. those that ended in a win or a loss), and multiplying by 100.

Notes
  denotes the Champion team(s).
  denotes a team that failed to play the minimum of eight matches. These teams are sometimes omitted from the table altogether.

Averages

References

External links
Minor Counties Championship 1896 at CricketArchive

1896 in English cricket
English cricket seasons in the 19th century
1896